Methanolobus tindarius is a methanogen archaeon. It is marine, mesophilic, coccoid, lobal and monotrichous flagellated. They were isolated from coastal sediments.

References

Further reading

External links

LPSN
Type strain of Methanolobus tindarius at BacDive -  the Bacterial Diversity Metadatabase

Euryarchaeota